Shashlik is a Pakistani comedy-drama sitcom which was written by Sarmad Khoosat, directed by Jawad Bashir and Khoosat. It was aired on Pakistan Television Corporation from 2001 to 2002. The main cast includes Khoosat, Nadia Afgan, Mandana Zaidi and Nasreen Qureshi. It was directorial as well as the acting debut of the Khoosat.

Overview 
The plot revolves around Cheeku who is not so manly, and his dynamics with her cousins who live in his house, Mishi, Munni, Kammo and Chunni. The sitcom also contains several situational songs.

Cast
 Nadia Afgan as Mishi
 Sarmad Khoosat as Cheeku
 Fatima Ahmed Khan as Kammo
 Mandana Zaidi as Munni
 Wajeeha Tahir as Chunni
 Nasreen Qureshi as Phuppo
 Irfan Khoosat

References 

2001 Pakistani television series debuts
Pakistani comedy television series
Pakistani drama television series
2002 Pakistani television series endings